Tarasa Shevchenka is a station on Kyiv Metro's Obolonsko–Teremkivska Line. The station was opened on 19 December 1980 in the northern part of the historic Podil neighbourhood and is named after the famous Ukrainian poet, writer, and painter, Taras Shevchenko. It was designed by T.A. Tselikovska, A.S. Krushynskyi, and A. Pratsiuk.

The station is located shallow underground and consists of a central hall with rectangular marble pillars. The walls along the tracks have been finished with dark red marble and ceramic tiles with a plant motif. The lighting comes from large round lamps hanging from the ceiling. At the end of the hall is a white stone bust of Taras Shevchenko, surrounded through the same plant motif that is located on the station's walls. The station is accessible by passenger tunnels on the Mezhyhirska and Olenivska Streets.

References

External links
 Kyivsky Metropoliten — Station description and photographs 
 Metropoliten.kiev.ua — Station description and photographs 

Kyiv Metro stations
Railway stations opened in 1980
1980 establishments in the Soviet Union
1980 establishments in Ukraine